Candedo may refer to the following places in Portugal:

Candedo (Murça), a parish in the municipality of Murça
Candedo (Vinhais), a parish in the municipality of Vinhais